The Quebec order of precedence is a nominal and symbolic hierarchy of important positions within the province of Quebec. It has no legal standing but is used to dictate ceremonial protocol at events of a provincial nature.

 The King of Canada (His Majesty Charles III)
 The Lieutenant Governor (J. Michel Doyon)
 The Premier (François Legault, MNA)
 The Cardinals followed, when not a cardinal, by the Roman Catholic Archbishop having the status of Primate 
 The President of the National Assembly  (François Paradis, MNA)
 The Chief Justice of the Court of Appeal (Manon Savard)
 The Vice-Premier 
 The Dean of the Diplomatic Corps and the heads of diplomatic missions
 The Leader of the Opposition 
 The members of the Executive Council
 The local Archbishop or Bishop followed by the representatives of other faith communities
 The local Mayor 
 The Dean of the Consular Corps in Quebec City followed by the Dean of the Consular Corps in Montréal, the heads of post of the Consular Corps living in the capital, for events happening there, and other heads of post, governed by their respective precedence
 The vice-presidents of the National Assembly 
 The chief justices of the Superior Court
 The local member of the National Assembly followed by other members
 The Secretary General of the Executive Council
 The President of the Council of the National Order of Quebec 
 The chief justices of the Court of Quebec 
 The rectors/principals of the local universities 
 The judges of the Court of Appeal 
 The Principal Secretary to the Premier followed by the deputy ministers 
 The judges of the Superior Court 
 The Ombudsman, the Chief Electoral Officer, the Auditor General, the presidents of the Government Agencies and Crown Corporations and the Chief of Protocol 
 The judges of the Court of Quebec 
 The members of the National Order of Quebec

References

External links
Table of Precedence for Quebec

Quebec